Arazeh (also Romanized as ‘Arāẕeh; also known as Qaşabeh, Qasbat an Nassār, Qoşbeh-ye Naşşār, and Qoşbeh-ye Nesār) is a village in Nasar Rural District, Arvandkenar District, Abadan County, Khuzestan Province, Iran. At the 2006 census, its population was 143, in 27 families.

References 

Populated places in Abadan County